Deborah "Debbie" Capozzi (born July 9, 1981) is an American sailor who competed in the 2008 Summer Olympics with Sally Barkow and Carrie Howe in the Yngling, coming 7th overall. At the 2012 Summer Olympics in the Elliott 6m class with Anna Tunnicliffe and Molly O'Bryan Vandemoer they came 5th overall.

References

External links
 
 
 

1981 births
Living people
American female sailors (sport)
Old Dominion Monarchs sailors
Olympic sailors of the United States
Sailors at the 2008 Summer Olympics – Yngling
Sailors at the 2012 Summer Olympics – Elliott 6m
21st-century American women